Paula Vicente (1519–1576), was a Portuguese artist, musician and writer.

She was the daughter of Gil Vicente and Mecília Rodrigues and sister of Luís Vicente. She was appointed lady-in-waiting to Maria of Portugal, Duchess of Viseu, and never married. She was a known scholar and musician, and wrote several plays.

Works
 Arte de Língua Inglesa e Holandesa para instrução dos seus Naturais

References

 AMARAL, Augusto Martins Ferreira do (1976). Barretos e Outros Contendo subsídios para a genealogia descendente de Gil Vicente. [S.l.: s.n.] pp. 49–50

1519 births
1576 deaths
16th-century Portuguese writers
16th-century Portuguese women writers
16th-century musicians
16th-century women musicians
Portuguese ladies-in-waiting